Gable Garenamotse (born February 28, 1977 in Gumare, North-West) is a Botswana long jumper, who has won two silver medals at the Commonwealth Games.

In 1999 Garenamotse won the triple jump at the African Southern Region Championships, and participated in both long jump and triple jump at the World Championships. Having peaked at a 16.66 metres jump that year, a national record, he decided to concentrate on long jump from thereon. His first international medal was a bronze at the 21st Universiade in 2001.

At the 2002 Commonwealth Games in Manchester Garenamotse placed second. He competed at the 2004 Olympics, without reaching the final. He repeated the second place four years later at the 2006 Commonwealth Games, setting a national record of 8.17 metres. In August the same year he improved to 8.27 metres. He won the gold medal at the 2007 All-Africa Games.

Gable Garenamotse did not reach the final at the 2007 World Championships, but finished fourth at the 2008 World Indoor Championships, seventh at the 2008 African Championships and ninth at the 2008 Olympic Games.

Competition record

References

External links
 

1977 births
Living people
People from North-West District (Botswana)
Athletes (track and field) at the 1998 Commonwealth Games
Athletes (track and field) at the 2002 Commonwealth Games
Athletes (track and field) at the 2004 Summer Olympics
Athletes (track and field) at the 2006 Commonwealth Games
Athletes (track and field) at the 2008 Summer Olympics
Botswana long jumpers
Botswana triple jumpers
Commonwealth Games silver medallists for Botswana
Olympic athletes of Botswana
Botswana male athletes
Commonwealth Games medallists in athletics
African Games gold medalists for Botswana
African Games medalists in athletics (track and field)
Universiade medalists in athletics (track and field)
Athletes (track and field) at the 1999 All-Africa Games
Athletes (track and field) at the 2003 All-Africa Games
Athletes (track and field) at the 2007 All-Africa Games
Universiade medalists for Botswana
Medalists at the 2001 Summer Universiade
Medallists at the 2002 Commonwealth Games
Medallists at the 2006 Commonwealth Games